Celaenorrhinus uluguru is a species of butterfly in the family Hesperiidae. It is found in the Uluguru Mountains of Tanzania, where it is endemic to Bondwa Mountain. The habitat consists of forests at altitudes between 1,450 and 1,800 meters.

The length of the forewings is 19.7-20.4 mm for males. The upperside ground colour is blackish brown, the forewing with a wide pale yellow median band. The female is unknown. Adult males mud-puddle and feed from flowering herbs.

References

Endemic fauna of Tanzania
Butterflies described in 1990
uluguru